George Etcell (April 2, 1898 – April 6, 1965) was an American boxer. He competed in the men's featherweight event at the 1920 Summer Olympics. After the attack on Pearl Harbor, Etcell was awarded the Navy Cross.

References

1898 births
1965 deaths
Featherweight boxers
American male boxers
Olympic boxers of the United States
Boxers at the 1920 Summer Olympics
Boxers from New York City